Kundakh is a rural locality (a selo) in Khurkhinsky Selsoviet, Laksky District, Republic of Dagestan, Russia. The population was 34 as of 2010.

Geography 
Kundakh is located 19 km northeast of Kumukh (the district's administrative centre) by road, on the right bank of the Kazikumukhskoye Koysu River. Kuma and Bagikla are the nearest rural localities.

Nationalities 
Laks live there.

References 

Rural localities in Laksky District